The Kent Rugby Challenge Cup is an annual rugby union knock-out club competition organised by the Kent Rugby Football Union. It was first introduced during the 1890-91 season, with the inaugural winners being R.N.C., Greenwich. It was discontinued after the 1926-27 season, but reintroduced during the 1969–70 season, the winners in that year were Sidcup.

The cup cost fifty-two guineas (around £50 in 1890-91) and does not become the property of the winners, being a perpetual challenge cup.

In 1952, during the period the competition had been discontinued, Kent Rugby Football Union provided the Kent Rugby Challenge Cup to Gravesend Rugby Football Club, for presentation to the winners of the North Kent Seven-a-Side Rugby Tournament, an annual tournament organised and run by the club from 1935 until 1972.

The Kent Rugby Challenge Cup competition, now more generally referred to as the Kent Cup competition, is the most important rugby union cup competition in Kent, ahead of the Kent Shield, Kent Vase, Kent Plate and Kent Salver.

The Kent Cup is currently open to the first teams of club sides based in Kent that play in tier 5 (National League 3 London & SE) and tier 6 (London 1 South) of the English rugby union league system, along with the 2nd teams of local clubs that play in tier 3 (National League 1) and tier 4 (National League 2 South).  The format is a knockout cup with a first round, second round, semi-finals and a final, typically to be held at a pre-determined ground at the end of April on the same date and venue as the Shield, Vase, Plate and Salver finals. Teams that are knocked out of the first round join the teams knocked out of the first round of the Kent Shield to compete for the Kent Plate.

Kent Challenge Cup winners

Number of wins
Blackheath (16)
R.N.C., Greenwich (9)
Westcombe Park (8)
Canterbury (6)
Catford Bridge (6)
Sidcup (6)
Gravesend (4)
Royal Engineers (4)
Maidstone (3)
Park House (3)
Askeans (2)
Guy's Hospital "A" (2)
Old Colfeians (2)
Tonbridge Juddians (2)
Chatham Garrison (1)
Duke of Wellington's Regiment (1)
King's Own Regiment (1)
Old Elthamians (1)
Queen's (1)
Sevenoaks (1)
Thanet Wanderers (1)

Notes

See also
 Kent RFU
 Kent Shield
 Kent Vase
 Kent Plate
 Kent Salver
 English rugby union system
 Rugby union in England

References

External links
 Kent RFU

Recurring sporting events established in 1970
1970 establishments in England
Rugby union cup competitions in England
Rugby union in Kent